Palaina taeniolata is a species of minute land snail with an operculum, a terrestrial gastropod mollusk or micromollusks in the family Diplommatinidae. This species is endemic to Guam.

References

T
Fauna of Guam
Molluscs of Oceania
Molluscs of the Pacific Ocean
Gastropods described in 1894
Taxonomy articles created by Polbot